Lesterville may refer to:

 Lesterville, Michigan
 Lesterville, Missouri
 Lesterville, South Dakota